is a Japanese city pop singer-songwriter, musician, and producer. He has released many studio albums, as well as several instrumental and live albums. He has been active since at least 1981 and is still active, having released his most recent album in August 2022.

Biography 

Kadomatsu began playing music at around grade 4 or 5, after seeing his older brother playing guitar and wanting to try it himself. Kadomatsu studied philosophy at Nihon University, where he participated in the university's music club. While still studying, he debuted as a musical artist in 1981 with single YOKOHAMA Twilight Time and the album Sea Breeze. In 1987, he released the hit instrumental album SEA IS A LADY which charted at No. 4. From 1993 to 1998, he went on a hiatus from releasing music and touring to focus on producing and songwriting for other Japanese artists, before returning with a successful comeback tour in 1999. Since then, he has been energetically engaged in artist activities, such as holding an anniversary concert every five years.

Kadomatsu is also energetically producing to other artists. Among them, Anri's album "Timely!!", Miho Nakayama's album "Catch The Nite" and the single "You're My Only Shinin' Star", which was fully produced, were sent to No. 1 on the Oricon weekly chart.

On March 11, 2022, Kadomatsu participated in the Shuichi "Ponta" Murakami tribute concert "One Last Live", performing "Sea Line", "Ramp In", and "Yokohama Twilight Time".

Discography

Studio albums

Compilations

Singles

Other appearances

References

External links 
 
 
 

1960 births
Japanese male singer-songwriters
Japanese singer-songwriters
Japanese male pop singers
Japanese rock musicians
Japanese guitarists
Singers from Tokyo
Living people